Wang Feifei (Chinese: 王霏霏; born April 27, 1987),  also known professionally as Fei, is a Chinese singer and actress. She was a member of the South Korean girl group miss A from the group's debut in 2010 until its disbandment in 2017. She debuted as a solo artist in 2016 in Korea with the mini album "Fantasy". After departing Korea in 2018, Fei has since pursued her solo career in China. In the second half of 2021, Fei released her much-anticipated Chinese album "Fearless 不霏" which includes three singles and is produced independently by Wang Feifei Studio with Fei as the Executive Producer.

Early life 
Fei was born Wang Feifei on April 27, 1987, in Haikou, Hainan, China. She displayed a talent for dancing at an early age and went to study dance at a school in Guangzhou, where JYP Entertainment recruited her in 2007. She later attended Seoul Institute of the Arts, alongside miss A member Jia.

Prior to debuting in South Korea, Fei appeared in a dance audition show at Zhejiang TV in 2009 and became a member of the project group, Sisters, the Chinese version of the Wonder Girls. Sisters, however, was soon canceled due to member changes within the company.

Career

2010–2017: miss A 

In March 2010, Fei, with fellow members Jia and Suzy, formed the group miss A. The trio began promoting in China by releasing the song "Love Again" for Samsung Electronics' Samsung Beat Festival. The group was later joined by a fourth member, Min. The four-member girl group made their debut in South Korea in July 2010, under the management of JYP Entertainment, with the hit single "Bad Girl Good Girl." Over the next several years, the group released a series of successful albums and singles, including "I Don't Need a Man," "Hush," “Touch,” “Only You,” and “Good-bye Baby” etc.

In addition to music, Fei made her acting debut with cameo appearances in the KBS drama Dream High in 2011 and its sequel in 2012.

In 2013, she appeared on the South Korean variety shows, MasterChef Korea Celebrity and Dancing with the Stars 3, in which she won second place and first place, respectively. She appeared on the Chinese reality show, If You Love, in 2014. That same year, she made a cameo appearance in the SBS drama Temptation, and contributed the song, "One Summer Night," featuring 2AM member Jo Kwon, to the soundtrack.

In 2015, Fei was confirmed to star in the web drama Swan, alongside Nam Gyu-ri and Cho Min Sung. She was also confirmed to star in the Chinese movie, Select Game.. For miss A's mini album 'Colors' (Chinese version), Fei made an attempt to write lyrics for the songs "I Caught Ya" and "Stuck".  

After the departure of Jia in May 2016 and Min in November 2017, miss A disbanded in December 2017. In 2017, Billboard ranked miss A at number ten on their "Top 10 K-pop Girl Groups of the Past Decade" list.

2016–2017: Solo Career Debut 
Fei made her solo singing debut in Korea on July 21, 2016, with the digital single "Fantasy". The title track “괜찮아 괜찮아 Fantasy” was ranked #14 on the 20 best K-pop songs of 2016 by Billboard critics. Other tracks in the album include “Sweet Sexy Fei” and “One More Kiss”.

2018–present: Rising Popularity in China 
On September 17, 2018, Fei collaborated with Gen Neo in the single "Will You Won't You". It was the first time Fei was involved in production works as a composer, lyricist, and singer.

On December 8, 2018, Fei released another single, “Hello”. The following January, Fei confirmed that she had parted ways with JYP Entertainment in late 2018 after her contract expired.

In January 2019, Fei joined Youku's idol group survival show, All for One (以团之名), as the dance coach and one of the judges. Her expertise, candidness, and strict coaching style generated much buzz on China's social platforms Weibo and Bilibili.

In June 2020, Fei joined the female celebrity idol group reality show Sisters Who Make Waves (乘风破浪的姐姐), which was themed around women's empowerment and self-actualization. It featured 30 female celebrities over 30 years old who must compete to debut in a seven-member girl group. The show became the most viewed and talked entertainment show in China in 2020, and Fei was one of the top contenders. Even though in the end, she didn't debut in the project girl group, in Weibo’s 2020 Entertainment White Paper, Fei was ranked no.1 among the 30 celebrity participants in soaring popularity.

Following the success, Fei went on to join another popular variety show, I Am The Actor (我就是演员), in December 2020. With the coach of Zhang Ziyi, Fei eventually made it into the final and won the award of "Bright Star".

On August 12, 2021, Fei released "Stalker 窥探者", the title track of her much-anticipated Chinese album "Fearless 不霏", which is produced independently by Wang Feifei Studio with Fei as the Executive Producer. "Stalker" is a song that empowers women to fight against manipulation and gaslighting. After its release, the song's MV surpassed 12 million views on Weibo in less than 12 hours, and received many accolades and rave reviews. "Stalker" was ranked no.1 on the weekly Rising Popularity chart (2021.08.09 - 2021.08.15) at QQ Music, China's largest music streaming platform.

On October 25, 2021, "Hunting Adonis 狩猎阿多尼斯", the 2nd single of the album, was released. Inspired by Shakespeare's poem portraying the unorthodox love story between Venus and Adonis, this song encourages people, especially women, to pursue their love and passion. In this music piece, Adonis symbolizes remarkable beauty, love, and the moment of revival and awakening.

On December 2, 2021, the rollout of the 3rd and final single, “Freaky Cinderella 疯狂灰姑娘”, marked the full release of the album. The song’s catchy tune and novel lyrics metaphorically depict a wonderland for the unusual and the unconventional and explicitly express Fei’s idea of breaking norms and traditions in search of freedom and self-realization. In April 2022, the physical album of Fearless was released with sumptuous photography and elaborate graphic design. 

On December 20, 2021, Fei delighted her fans amid the holiday season with the release of “At Christmas”, a cozy and romantic Christmas duet co-created with Chinese singer-songwriter Ryan. B.

In April 2022, Fei joined Youku's hit dance variety show, Great Dance Crew (了不起! 舞社), as one of the four dance team leaders. The show brings together 60 female dancers from all walks of life to compete and advance, and eventually form a top-notch dance crew to participate in the World Hip Hop Dance Championship. 

Along with the music release and presence on stage and entertainment shows, Fei continues to diversify her career opportunities and shift more focus to acting. In September 2021, she finished filming the web series My Marvelous Fable (夏日奇妙书), in which she plays the lead actress role. In June 2022, Fei joined the cast of One and Only (热烈), a movie about a group of dancers chasing their dreams. 

Over the past few years, Fei has gained millions of fans on major Chinese social platforms - Weibo, Red, Douyin, and Bilibili, and earned an influencer and trendsetter reputation (人间种草机) by discovering and sharing beauty and lifestyle tips in her vlog series. According to CBNData, Fei topped the Celebrity Influence in Beauty ranking in the first two quarters of 2021 consecutively. Her credibility and positive image have brought her collaborations with brands across multiple categories including beauty, clothing, footwear, and food & beverage. In 2020 and 2021, she was the brand ambassador for Bebe, OUAI, Sephora Collection Makeup, Skechers, Rituals, L'Oréal Paris hair color, and Sisley Paris Sisleÿa in China. As of July 2022, Fei was the ambassador of Michael Kors for Greater China, Unilever for China, and Dr.Ci:Labo for the Asia Pacific region.

Through collaborations with luxury fashion houses like Louis Vuitton, Celine, and Fendi and avant-garde designers like Creepyyeha, Fei has forged her own unwaveringly unique sense of style - sharp, daring, and uncompromising, yet also fluid and evolving with a new discovery at every turn. Her stellar performance with Balmain was one of the brand's most-liked celebrity portrayals worldwide in 2021 and was featured in the brand's year-end highlights. In July 2022, Balmain released its Qixi capsule collection to celebrate Chinese Valentine's Day with Fei as the face of the campaign. 

On September 26, 2021, Fei made her e-commerce livestreamer debut as the Chief Fashionista (首席时髦精) at Alibaba-owned Tmall Celebrity Pick (天猫星选), an influential e-commerce platform where a select group of respected celebrities hosts livestream sessions in collaboration with brands and products that fit with each celebrity's profile and speciality. Fei’s Fashion (霏常时髦) is Tmall’s tailored program that characterizes and encapsulates Fei's livestream content. Her debut livestream featured a well-curated list of products in fashion, accessories, beauty, and food & beverage, and attracted close to 3 million viewers and brought about 74 million views to the hashtag Tmall Celebrity Pick on Weibo.

Discography

Singles

Soundtrack Appearances

Filmography

Films

Drama

Variety Shows

Radio shows

Event Hosting

Awards and nominations

References

External links

1987 births
Living people
Miss A members
JYP Entertainment artists
Chinese expatriates in South Korea
Chinese women singers
Chinese female models
Chinese film actresses
Chinese idols
Chinese K-pop singers
Chinese television actresses
Korean-language singers of China
Mandarin-language singers
People from Haikou
Singers from Hainan
Actresses from Hainan